Ole Jensen (1 December 1872 – 6 March 1943) was a Norwegian sport shooter. He was born in Kinn in what is now the municipality of Flora. He competed in team rifle at the 1912 Summer Olympics in Stockholm, where Norwegian team placed sixth.

References

External links

1872 births
1943 deaths
People from Flora, Norway
Norwegian male sport shooters
Olympic shooters of Norway
Shooters at the 1912 Summer Olympics
Sportspeople from Vestland
20th-century Norwegian people